Giannis Varouxakis (born 9 December 1991) is a Greek footballer who plays for AEEK SYN.KA.

Club career
Varouxakis played in the youth teams at Asteras Chalepas, Chania and OFI Crete, and then moved on to Panserraikos and Apollon Kalamarias, before returning to Chania (where he played professionally in Football League 2), followed by stints at Kissamikos, Panakrotiriakos and Dotieas Agia.

In 2015, he moved to England where he joined Woodford Town in the Spartan South Midlands League, before signing for National League South side Weston-super-Mare. He then joined Eastbourne Borough for the 2016-17 season, but played only three games before joining Bishop's Stortford at the end of August 2016. Varouxakis then joined Cockfosters. He joined Biggleswade United for the 2017-18 season. After only three appearances, he returned to Greece and re-joined Asteras Chalepas, before joining Spatha Kolymvariou and then in February 2019 he joined Charaviakos. In the 2019-20 season he played for Nafpaktiakos Asteras and AEEK SYN.KA.

References

External links

Ioannis Varouxakis at Aylesbury United

1991 births
Living people
Greek footballers
Greek expatriate footballers
Association football forwards
OFI Crete F.C. players
Panserraikos F.C. players
Apollon Pontou FC players
AO Chania F.C. players
Woodford Town F.C. players
Weston-super-Mare A.F.C. players
Eastbourne Borough F.C. players
Bishop's Stortford F.C. players
Cockfosters F.C. players
Biggleswade United F.C. players
Nafpaktiakos Asteras F.C. players
Football League (Greece) players
National League (English football) players
Gamma Ethniki players
Expatriate footballers in England
Footballers from Chania